Lukengu Ngalula (born 11 August 1971) is a Congolese basketball player. She competed in the women's tournament at the 1996 Summer Olympics.

References

External links
 

1971 births
Living people
Democratic Republic of the Congo women's basketball players
Olympic basketball players of the Democratic Republic of the Congo
Basketball players at the 1996 Summer Olympics
Basketball players from Kinshasa
21st-century Democratic Republic of the Congo people